Brandon Williams (born June 21, 1988) is a former American football linebacker in the National Football League (NFL) for the Dallas Cowboys and Arizona Cardinals. He played college football at Texas Tech University.

Early years
Williams attended South Hills High School. He received All-district (District 8-4A) honors as a senior, after registering 102 tackles and 11 sacks.

College career
Williams accepted a football scholarship from Texas Tech University. As a true freshman, he appeared in 11 games as a backup defensive end, tallying 16 tackles and 3.5 sacks (third on the team). He had five tackles and 2 sacks against Southeastern Louisiana University.

As a sophomore, he became a starter at defensive end, leading the team with 6 sacks and 12.5 tackles for loss. He also had 41 tackles, 2 passes defensed, 3 forced fumble and one fumble recovery.

As a junior, he registered 11 sacks (led Big 12 Conference and tied for fourth in school history), 13 tackles for loss, 21 tackles, 3 passes defensed and one forced fumble. He made 4 tackles (3 for loss), 2 sacks and one forced fumble in the 2009 Cotton Bowl Classic against the University of Mississippi.

At the end of the season, he declared his intention to enter the 2009 NFL Draft. At the same press conference when he announced his plans to forgo his senior season, he accompanied Texas Tech wide receiver Michael Crabtree, who made a similar announcement. He finished his college career with 78 tackles (29 for loss), 20.5 sacks (fourth in school history), 6 passes defensed, 6 forced fumbles and one fumble recovery.

Professional career

Dallas Cowboys
Williams was selected by the Dallas Cowboys in the fourth round (120th overall) of the 2009 NFL Draft, with the plan of converting him into an outside linebacker on their 3-4 defense. He tore his left ACL in the second preseason game while playing special teams and was placed on the injured reserve list on September 1.

In his second season, he played tentatively coming back from injury and was declared inactive in 10 games. He finished with four special teams tackles. He was waived on September 3, 2011.

Arizona Cardinals
The Arizona Cardinals signed him to their practice squad on November 22, 2011. He was promoted to the active roster on December 21. Williams was released with a shoulder injury on August 31, 2012.

Coaching career
In 2016, he was the Texas Stealth head coach of the American Indoor Football league. He is a football coach at Nolan Catholic High School.

Personal life
Williams parents are Debra and Gary Hampton, who have also two daughters, LaToya and Camry, and 2 other sons, Demondre and Gary Jr.

References

1988 births
Living people
Sportspeople from Lubbock, Texas
Sportspeople from Fort Worth, Texas
Players of American football from Dallas
African-American coaches of American football
American football linebackers
American football defensive ends
Texas Tech Red Raiders football players
Dallas Cowboys players
Arizona Cardinals players
21st-century African-American sportspeople
20th-century African-American people